Vitali Viktorovich Doroshenko (born 4 May 1971 in Yeysk) is a former Russian football player and referee.

Referee career
Assistant referee
 Russian Third League: 1996–1997
 Russian Second Division: 1997–2004
 Russian First Division: 1998–2005
 Russian Football Premier League: 2001–2005

Referee
 Russian Third League: 1997
 Russian Second Division: 1998–2009
 Russian First Division: 2001–2009
 Russian Football Premier League: 2007–2009

References

1971 births
People from Yeysk
Living people
Soviet footballers
Russian footballers
FC Kuban Krasnodar players
Russian Premier League players
Russian football referees

Association football defenders